The Governing Senate was the highest legislative, judicial, and executive body subordinate to the Russian emperors, instituted by Peter the Great to replace the Boyar Duma and lasted until the very end of the Russian Empire. It was chaired by the Procurator General, who served as the link between the sovereign and the Senate; he acted, in the emperor's own words, as "the sovereign's eye".

Description
Originally established only for the time of Peter's absence, it became a permanent body after his return. The number of senators was first set at nine and, in 1712, increased to ten. Any disagreements between the Chief Procurator and the Senate were to be settled by the monarch. Certain other officials and a chancellery were also attached to the Senate. While it underwent many subsequent changes, it became one of the most important institutions of imperial Russia, especially for administration and law.

The State Council, created by Alexander I, was supposed to inherit the executive power of the Senate. An envisioned parliament was to inherit legislative power, but that never happened.

In the 19th century, the Senate evolved into the highest judicial body in Russia. As such, it exercised control over all legal institutions and officials throughout the country.

The Senate was composed of several departments, two of which were Courts of Cassation (one for criminal cases, one for civil cases). It also included a Department of Heraldry, which managed matters relating to the rights of the nobles and honorary citizens.

First nine senators
Count Ivan Musin-Pushkin, Boyar Tikhon Streshnev, Prince Petr Golitsyn, Prince Mikhail Dolgorukov, Grigoriy Plemiannikov, Prince Grigoriy Volkonskiy, General Mikhail Samarin, Quartermaster general Vasiliy Apukhtin и Nazariy Melnitskiy. As an ober-secretary was appointed Anisim Schukin.

Procurator Generals

Procurator Generals and Ministers of Justice

See also
 Pruth River Campaign (1710—1711)

Sources and references

References

Government of the Russian Empire
1711 establishments in Russia
1917 disestablishments in Russia
Organizations established in the 1710s